The yellow-cheeked tit (Machlolophus spilonotus) is a species of bird in the family Paridae.

It is found in Bangladesh, Bhutan, China, Hong Kong, India, Laos, Myanmar, Nepal, Thailand, and Vietnam.

Its natural habitats are subtropical or tropical moist lowland forest and subtropical or tropical moist montane forest.

The yellow-cheeked tit was formerly one of the many species in the genus Parus but was moved to Machlolophus after a molecular phylogenetic analysis published in 2013 showed that the members of the new genus formed a distinct clade.

References

yellow-cheeked tit
Birds of Bhutan
Birds of South China
Birds of Hong Kong
Birds of Northeast India
Birds of Laos
Birds of Myanmar
Birds of Thailand
Birds of Yunnan
yellow-cheeked tit
yellow-cheeked tit
Taxonomy articles created by Polbot